Aubrey Burton-Durham (21 August 1906 – 5 October 1959) was a South African sprinter. He competed in the men's 100 metres at the 1928 Summer Olympics.

References

External links
 

1906 births
1959 deaths
Athletes (track and field) at the 1928 Summer Olympics
South African male sprinters
Olympic athletes of South Africa
Sportspeople from Johannesburg